South Central Regional Medical Center is the only hospital located in Laurel, Mississippi.  Founded in 1952, it is one of the largest employers in Laurel, employing nearly 2,000 people. A hospital-owned ambulance service, "EMServ", operates out of the medical center.

In 2013 and 2014, the facility's average length of stay was about 4.6 days and its Medicaid utilization rate was near 70 percent.

References

External links
South Central Regional Medical Center

Buildings and structures in Jones County, Mississippi
Hospitals in Mississippi
Hospitals established in 1952